The 1947 Colorado A&M Aggies football team represented Colorado State College of Agriculture and Mechanic Arts in the Mountain States Conference (MSC) during the 1947 college football season.  In their first season under head coach Bob Davis, the Aggies compiled a 5–4–1 record (2–3–1 against MSC opponents), finished fifth in the MSC, and were outscored by a total of 182 to 159. The team played its home games at Colorado Field in Fort Collins, Colorado.

Schedule

References

Colorado AandM
Colorado State Rams football seasons
Colorado AandM Aggies football